Laudakia sacra, also known commonly as Anan's rock agama, is a species of lizard in the family Agamidae. The species is endemic to Tibet.

Etymology
The common name, Anan's rock agama, refers to Russian herpetologist Natalia Borisovna Ananjeva (born 1946).

Habitat

Description

Reproduction
L. sacra is oviparous.

References

Further reading
Ananjeva NB, Peters G, Macey JR, Papenfuss TJ (1990). "Stellio sacra (Smith, 1935) – a Distinct Species of Asiatic Rock Agamid from Tibet". Asiatic Herpetological Research 3: 104–115. (Stellio sacra, new status, new combination).
Baig KJ, Wagner P, Ananjeva NB, Böhme W (2012). "A morphology-based taxonomic revision of Laudakia Gray, 1845 (Squamata: Agamidae). Vertebrate Zoology 62 (2): 213–260. (Laudakia sacra, p. 250).
Macey JR, Schulte JA, Larson A, Ananjeva NB, Wang Y (2000). "Evaluating Trans-Tethys Migration: An Example Using Acrodont Lizard Phylogenetics". Systematic Biology 49 (2): 233–256. (Laudakia sacra, new combination).
Smith MA (1935). The Fauna of British India, Including Ceylon and Burma. Reptilia and Amphibia. Vol. II.—Sauria. London: Secretary of State for India in Council. (Taylor and Francis, printers). xiii + 440 pp. + Plate I + 2 maps. (Agama himalayana sacra, new subspecies, p. 214).

Laudakia
Reptiles of China
Endemic fauna of Tibet
Reptiles described in 1935
Taxa named by Malcolm Arthur Smith